Deng Baoshan (1894 – November 27, 1968) was a People's Republic of China politician. He was born in Tianshui, Gansu Province. He was commander of the New 1st Army. During the Xi'an Incident of 1936, he supported Zhang Xueliang and Yang Hucheng. He was the 2nd governor of his home province after the creation of the People's Republic.

1894 births
1968 deaths
People's Republic of China politicians from Gansu
Chinese Communist Party politicians from Gansu
Governors of Gansu
People from Tianshui
Victims of the Cultural Revolution